Hillarys is an electoral district of the Legislative Assembly in the Australian state of Western Australia.

The district is based in Perth's northern suburbs. Politically, it is typically a safe Liberal seat but Caitlin Collins won it for the Labor Party for the first time at the 2021 election.

Geography
Hillarys is an outer northern suburban seat in Perth. It is bounded to the north by Ocean Reef Road, to the east by the Mitchell Freeway, to the west by the Indian Ocean and to the south by Hepburn Avenue. The district includes the suburbs of Hillarys, Padbury, Kallaroo, Mullaloo, Beldon and Craigie.

History
The district was first contested at the 1996 state election, essentially replacing the seat of Whitford. It was held by Liberal MP Rob Johnson from its creation until his 2017 defeat, after resigning from the party to sit as an independent. The district boundaries were redistributed in 2019 and saw the suburb of Sorrento being removed while the suburbs of Beldon and Mullaloo added.

Members for Hillarys

Election results

References

External links
 ABC election profiles: 2005 2008
 WAEC district maps: current boundaries, previous distributions

Hillarys